Lü Pin (born 3 May 1995) is a Chinese footballer who currently plays for Guangxi Pingguo Haliao, on loan from Shanghai Shenhua in the China League One.

Club career
Lü Pin joined Chinese Super League side Shanghai Shenhua's youth academy from Shanghai Luckystar in 2014. He started his professional football career in 2015 when he was loaned to Shanghai Shenhua's satellite team CF Crack's in the Primera Regional of Valencia. He was loaned to another satellite team Atlético Museros for the 2015–16 season. In July 2016, he was loaned to Segunda División B side Atlético Saguntino for one season. He was then loaned to Tercera División side Olímpic after failing to establish himself at Atlético Saguntino.

Lü was promoted to Shanghai Shenhua's first team squad in 2017 by Gus Poyet. He made his debut for Shanghai Shenhua on 2 May 2017 in the third round of 2017 Chinese FA Cup against Yunnan Lijiang in a 3–0 win. On 30 June 2017, he made his league debut in an 8–1 win over Liaoning FC.

Career statistics
.

Honours

Club
Shanghai Shenhua
Chinese FA Cup: 2017

References

External links

 

1995 births
Living people
Chinese footballers
Footballers from Wuhan
Shanghai Shenhua F.C. players
Suzhou Dongwu F.C. players
Chinese Super League players
China League Two players
Chinese expatriate footballers
Expatriate footballers in Spain
Chinese expatriate sportspeople in Spain
Association football midfielders
Atlético Saguntino players
Guangxi Pingguo Haliao F.C. players
21st-century Chinese people